The Beach Volleyball at the 2006 Central American and Caribbean Games was held July 16–29, 2006 in Cartagena, Colombia.

Women's competition

Men's competition

References
 Norceca 

2006 Central American and Caribbean Games
Central American and Caribbean Games
Beach volleyball at the Central American and Caribbean Games